Steven Anson Coons (March 7, 1912 – August 1979) was an early pioneer in the field of computer graphical methods. He was a professor at the Massachusetts Institute of Technology in the Mechanical Engineering Department. He was also a professor at Syracuse University after leaving MIT. Steven Coons had a vision of interactive computer graphics as a design tool to aid the engineer.

Work 
While a student at MIT, Steven Anson Coons was employed by the Chance Vought Aircraft Company, in the Master Dimensions Department.  He developed a new conic curve based on the unit square.  He published a report entitled  An Analytic Method for Calculations of the Contours of Double Curved Surfaces. The surface was controlled by one through seventh order polynomials and each curve was express as being one unit long and the element plane in a unit square.  The polynomials are written:

and

This concept allows for the approximate matching of any curve, conic or not.  The surface element plane normally a conic curve  was expressed as:
         
 

By selecting proper values for Φ (similar to K in the conic family) in this equation:

 

the curve will be fixed.  By arbitrarily choosing values of Φ, u and w could be solved for:
 
 

During World War II, he worked on the design of aircraft surfaces, developing the mathematics to describe generalized "surface patches." At MIT's Electronic Systems Laboratory he investigated the mathematical formulation for these patches, and published one of the most significant contributions to the area of geometric design, a treatise which has become known as "The Little Red Book" in 1967. His "Coons patch" was a formulation that presented the notation, mathematical foundation, and intuitive interpretation of an idea that would ultimately become the foundation for surface descriptions that are commonly used today, such as b-spline surfaces, NURB surfaces, etc. His technique for describing a surface was to construct it out of collections of adjacent patches, which had continuity constraints that would allow surfaces to have curvature which was expected by the designer. Each patch was defined by four boundary curves, and a set of "blending functions" that defined how the interior was constructed out of interpolated values of the boundaries.

Coons's students included Ivan Sutherland and Lawrence Roberts, both of whom went on to make numerous contributions to computer graphics and (in Roberts' case) to computer networks.  Coons also advised Nicholas Negroponte.

Coons co-authored, with John Thomas Rule, a book on mechanical drawing and graphic methods entitled Graphics c. 1961.

Steven A. Coons Award 
The Association for Computing Machinery SIGGRAPH has an award named for Coons. The Steven Anson Coons Award for Outstanding Creative Contributions to Computer Graphics is given in odd-numbered years to an individual to honor that person's lifetime contribution to computer graphics and interactive techniques. It is considered the field's most prestigious award.

Recipients
Markus Gross (2021)
Michael F. Cohen (2019)
Jessica Hodgins (2017)
 Henry Fuchs (2015)
 Turner Whitted (2013)
 Jim Kajiya (2011)
 Robert L. Cook (2009)
 Nelson Max (2007)
 Tomoyuki Nishita (2005)
 Pat Hanrahan (2003)
 Lance J. Williams (2001)
 James F. Blinn (1999)
 James D. Foley (1997)
 José Luis Encarnação (1995)
 Edwin Catmull (1993)
 Andries van Dam (1991)
 David C. Evans (1989)
 Donald P. Greenberg (1987)
 Pierre Bézier (1985)
 Ivan E. Sutherland (1983)

Research Papers
T.B. Sheridan, Steven A. Coons and H.M.Paynter, SOME NOVEL DISPLAY TECHNIQUES FOR DRIVING SIMULATION IEEE TRANSACTIONS ON HUMAN FACTORS IN ENGINEERING vol. HFE5 (1) 29, 1964.
Steven A. Coons, COMPUTER GRAPHICS AND INNOVATIVE ENGINEERING DESIGN – SUPER-SCULPTOR, DATAMATION 12 (5) 32–34, 1966.
Steven A. Coons, USES OF COMPUTERS IN TECHNOLOGY, SCIENTIFIC AMERICAN 215 (3) 177, 1966.
D.V. Ahuja and Steven A. Coons, GEOMETRY FOR CONSTRUCTION AND DISPLAY, IBM SYSTEMS JOURNAL 7 (3–4) 188, 1968.
Steven A. Coons, MODIFICATION OF SHAPE OF PIECEWISE CURVES, COMPUTER-AIDED DESIGN 9 (3) 178–180, 1977.
Steven A. Coons, CONSTRAINED LEAST-SQUARES, COMPUTERS & GRAPHICS 3 (1) 43–47, 1978.

MIT School of Engineering faculty
1979 deaths
1912 births
Computer graphics researchers